Ian Arnold (born 4 July 1972) is a former professional footballer who played in the Football League for Carlisle United and Middlesbrough. While at Carlisle, he had a loan spell at Stalybridge Celtic. Arnold then played for Kettering Town for the 1994–95 season, before returning for two seasons at Stalybridge Celtic, before joining Kidderminster Harriers at the start of the 1997–98 campaign. He also played for Southport, Morecambe, Barrow and Workington.

References

1972 births
Living people
Sportspeople from Durham, England
Footballers from County Durham
Association football forwards
English footballers
Middlesbrough F.C. players
Carlisle United F.C. players
Stalybridge Celtic F.C. players
Kettering Town F.C. players
Kidderminster Harriers F.C. players
Southport F.C. players
Morecambe F.C. players
Barrow A.F.C. players
Workington A.F.C. players
English Football League players
England semi-pro international footballers